A glyph is any kind of purposeful mark. In typography, a glyph is "the specific shape, design, or representation of a character". It is a particular graphical representation, in a particular typeface, of an element of written language. A grapheme, or part of a grapheme (such as a diacritic), or sometimes several graphemes in combination (a composed glyph) can be represented by a glyph.

Glyphs, graphemes and characters 

In most languages written in any variety of the Latin alphabet except English, the use of diacritics to signify a sound mutation is common. For example, the grapheme  requires two glyphs: the basic  and the grave accent . In general, a diacritic is regarded as a glyph, even if it is contiguous with the rest of the character like a cedilla in French, Catalan or Portuguese, the ogonek in several languages, or the stroke on a Polish "Ł". Although these marks originally had no independent meaning, they have since acquired meaning in the field of mathematics and computing, for instance.

However, in Turkish and adjacent languages, this dot is a glyph because that language has two distinct versions of the letter i, with and without a dot.  

In Japanese syllabaries, some of the characters are made up of more than one separate mark, but in general these separate marks are not glyphs because they have no meaning by themselves. However, in some cases, additional marks fulfil the role of diacritics, to differentiate distinct characters. Such additional marks constitute glyphs.  

Some characters such as "æ" in Icelandic and the "ß" in German may be regarded as glyphs. They were originally typographic ligatures, but over time have become characters in their own right; these languages treat them as unique letters. However, a ligature such as "fi", that is treated in some typefaces as a single unit, is arguably not a glyph as this is just a design choice of that typeface, essentially an allographic feature, and includes more than one grapheme. In normal handwriting, even long words are often written "joined up", without the pen leaving the paper, and the form of each written letter will often vary depending on which letters precede and follow it, but that does not make the whole word into a single glyph.

Older models of typewriters required the use of multiple glyphs to depict a single character, as an overstruck apostrophe and period to create an exclamation mark. If there is more than one allograph of a unit of writing, and the choice between them depends on context or on the preference of the author, they now have to be treated as separate glyphs, because mechanical arrangements have to be available to differentiate between them and to print whichever of them is required. 

In computing as well as typography, the term "character" refers to a grapheme or grapheme-like unit of text, as found in natural language writing systems (scripts). In typography and computing, the range of graphemes is broader than in a written language in other ways too: a typeface often has to cope with a range of different languages each of which contribute their own graphemes, and it may also be required to print non-linguistic symbols such as dingbats. The range of glyphs required increases correspondingly. In summary, in typography and computing, a glyph is a graphical unit.

See also
 Unicode code block Arabic Presentation Forms-B

Notes

References

External links

 

Archaeological terminology
Graphemes
 
Infographics
Typographical symbols
Typography